Kothagudem Thermal Power Station is located at Paloncha in Telangana, India. The power plant has an installed capacity of 1,800 MW with 4 units in operation. It is one of the coal based power plants of Telangana Power Generation Corporation Limited (TSGENCO)

In January 2012, it was reported that the Andhra Pradesh government has decided to build additional unit with capacity of 800 MW.

References 

Khammam district
Coal-fired power stations in Telangana
1966 establishments in Andhra Pradesh